Abzal Azhgaliyev (born 30 June 1992) is a Kazakh male short track speed skater. He has competed in three Winter Olympic Games and is the first short track skater from Kazakhstan to win a World Cup event. Holding eight World Cup podiums, he is the most decorated Kazakh skater.

Early life 
Azhgaliyev was born in 1992 in Uralsk, West Kazakhstan. He started skating at age nine when a recruiter came to his school and encouraged boys to try the sport. At age eleven he tried short track and loved the speed of it. He left secondary school and moved to a special school where he could focus on his training. He graduated from the Kazakh Academy of Sport and Tourism with a degree in sports education.

Career 
His coaches are Madygali Karsybekov, Zhasulan Mukhambetkaliev, and Pyotr Gamidov.

Azhgaliyev's first international competition was in Moscow in 2006. It hooked him on the sport.

In 2007, Azhgaliyev was designated Master of Sports of the Republic of Kazakhstan.

In 2011, Azhgaliyev was on the relay team that won the bronze medal in the Asian Games.

Azhgaliyev was the first Kazakh skater to win a World Cup event when he medaled in the 500m in 2016 in Salt Lake City, UT, United States. His time was 40.373 seconds. He received the title of Master of Sports of International Class of the Republic of Kazakhstan.

With state funding, Azhgaliyev and the other members of the national relay team trained in the Netherlands. However, he professed to prefer training in Kazakhstan, instead. He prefers to be with family. Now he trains in Nur-Sultan, where new facilities have been constructed. Russian skaters Semen Elistratov and Dmitry Migunov train in Nur-Sultan with the Kazakh team.

He has skated three times in the Winter Olympics.

His first winter games were in Sochi, Russia, in 2014, where he skated in the Men's 5000 Meters Relay. The team took fifth place.

He was the flagbearer in the 2018 Winter Olympics in Pyeongchang, Korea, where he was also the captain of the Kazakh National Olympic Team. He competed in the Men's 5000 Meters Relay.

In 2022, Azhgaliyev was once again the flagbearer for Kazakhstan. In the Beijing, China, he competed in the 500m Men's event, as well as the Mixed Team Relay team with Adil Galiakhmetov, Denis Nikisha, Yana Khan, and Olga Tikhonova. Their relay team placed fifth.

His athletic heroes include Russia's Viktor An, Canadian Charles Hamelin, and China's Wang Meng.

Personal life 
He enjoys playing video games and watching soccer. His favorite teams are FC Akzhayik Uralsk and FC Barcelona. Before big races, he likes to have dinner with friends and family.

References

External links
 Abzal Azhgaliyev's profile , from http://www.sochi2014.com ; retrieved 2014-06-14.
 
 

1992 births
Living people
Kazakhstani male short track speed skaters
Olympic short track speed skaters of Kazakhstan
Short track speed skaters at the 2014 Winter Olympics
Short track speed skaters at the 2018 Winter Olympics
Short track speed skaters at the 2022 Winter Olympics
Asian Games medalists in short track speed skating
Asian Games bronze medalists for Kazakhstan
Short track speed skaters at the 2011 Asian Winter Games
Medalists at the 2011 Asian Winter Games
Universiade medalists in short track speed skating
Universiade silver medalists for Kazakhstan
Universiade bronze medalists for Kazakhstan
Competitors at the 2017 Winter Universiade
People from Oral, Kazakhstan
21st-century Kazakhstani people